Kurumbu is a 2003 Indian Tamil-language romantic comedy film directed by Vishnuvardhan, making his directorial debut. The film, a remake of the 2002 Telugu film Allari, stars Naresh, who also starred in the original version, which marked his acting debut, along with Nikita Thukral and Diya. The film released on 21 November 2003 to poor reviews, failing to repeat the success of the original version and hence, ending up as a box-office bomb, being considered as the only commercially unsuccessful film of director Vishnuvardhan. Although there is the Telugu original, it was dubbed in Telugu also as Naa Allari.

It deals with a love triangle between three teenagers. The story portrays how the hero finds his true love.

Cast
 Naresh as Ravi
 Nikita as Aparna
 Diya as Ruchi
 Pyramid Natarajan as Ravi's father
 Meera Krishnan as Kalyani, Ravi's mother
 Apsara as Ravi's sister
 Kuyili as Aparna's mother
 Nassar as Ruchi's father
 Nirosha as Ruchi's mother   
 R. S. Shivaji as Arokyam, a lift man in the apartment 
 Bava Lakshmanan
 Ramya Krishnan in a cameo role

Soundtrack

The music was composed by Yuvan Shankar Raja, teaming up with newcomer Vishnuvardhan, who since then has worked together with him and scored the music in all his films until Shershaah. The soundtrack was released on 7 August 2003, featuring 8 tracks, including one remixed song, which is the first ever remix of a Tamil film song to feature in another Tamil film, starting off a new trend and the era of remixes in the Tamil film industry. The lyrics were penned by Pa. Vijay.

Release
Malathi Rangarajan of The Hindu opined that "After all the hype and pre-release publicity of the film you expected much more. But leave alone making you laugh, this Kurumbu does not even tickle". A critic from Deccan Herald wrote that "Kurumbu, directed by debutant Vishnuvardhan is clearly targetted at the youth". Another critic gave the film a rating of 1.5/5.

References

External links
 

2003 films
Films directed by Vishnuvardhan (director)
Tamil remakes of Telugu films
2000s Tamil-language films
Films scored by Yuvan Shankar Raja
Indian romantic comedy films
2003 directorial debut films
2003 romantic comedy films